Thitarodes baqingensis is a species of moth of the family Hepialidae. It was described by Yang and Jiang in 1995, and is known from the Tibet Autonomous Region of China.

References

External links
Hepialidae genera

Moths described in 1995
Hepialidae